The Schuyler Carnegie Library is a historic building in Schuyler, Nebraska. It was built as a Carnegie library by P.H. Wind & Sons in 1911, and designed in the Tudor Revival style by the architectural firm Fisher & Lawrie. It was a library until 1975, and it housed the Schuyler / Colfax County Historical Society Museum from 1977 to 1998. It has been listed on the National Register of Historic Places since November 29, 2001.

References

National Register of Historic Places in Colfax County, Nebraska
Tudor Revival architecture in the United States
Library buildings completed in 1911
1911 establishments in Nebraska
Carnegie libraries in Nebraska